ISO/IEC JTC 1/SC 25 Interconnection of information technology equipment is a standardization subcommittee of the Joint Technical Committee ISO/IEC JTC 1, of the International Organization for Standardization (ISO) and the International Electrotechnical Commission (IEC), which develops and facilitates standards within the field of interconnection of information technology equipment. The international secretariat of ISO/IEC JTC 1/SC 25 is the Deutsches Institut für Normung (DIN) located in Germany.

History
ISO/IEC JTC 1/SC 25 was formed in 1989 after the creation of ISO/IEC JTC 1. When ISO and IEC decided to create the joint technical committee, JTC 1, in 1988, there was a reorganization of the structure. Eventually in 1989, IEC SC 83: Information technology equipment and ISO/IEC JTC 1/SC 13: Interconnection of equipment, were joined to form the current subcommittee, ISO/IEC JTC 1/SC 25: Interconnection of information technology equipment. The new subcommittee also adopted the standardization activity of ISO/IEC JTC 1/SC 26, under ISO/IEC JTC 1/SC 25/WG 4.

Scope
The scope of ISO/IEC JTC 1/SC 25 is the standardization of:
 Microprocessor systems; and of
 interfaces, protocols, architectures, and associated interconnecting media for information technology equipment and networks, generally for
 Commercial and residential environments, to support embedded and distributed computing environments, storage systems, other input/output
 Home and building electronic systems including customer premises smart grid applications for electricity, gas, water and heat.
The scope includes:
 Requirements for components, assemblies, and subsystems
 The development of network interfaces, in liaison with committees for external utility networks, to support smart grid applications at the customer premises.
The scope excludes:
 Standardization of cables, waveguides and connectors remains within the relevant product technical committees and subcommittees of IEC.

Structure
ISO/IEC JTC 1/SC 25 is made up of three active working groups and one task group, each of which carries out specific tasks in standards development within the field of interconnection of information technology equipment. As a response to changing standardization needs, working groups of ISO/IEC JTC 1/SC 25 can be disbanded if their area of work is no longer applicable, or established if new working areas arise. The focus of each working group is described in the group’s terms of reference. Active working groups of ISO/IEC JTC 1/SC 25 are:

ISO/IEC JTC 1/SC 25 also has the task group (TG), ISO/IEC JTC 1/SC 25/TG 1, titled Project Team: Taxonomy and Terminology (PTTT), which is working to coordinate the standardization activities for intelligent homes.

Collaborations
ISO/IEC JTC 1/SC 25 works in close collaboration with a number of other organizations or subcommittees, both internal and external to ISO or IEC, in order to avoid conflicting or duplicative work. Organizations internal to ISO or IEC that collaborate with or are in liaison to ISO/IEC JTC 1/SC 25 include:
 ISO/IEC JTC 1/SC 6, Telecommunications and information exchange between systems
 ISO/IEC JTC 1/SC 27, IT Security techniques
 ISO/IEC JTC 1/SC 32, Data management and interchange
 ISO/IEC JTC 1/SC 39, Sustainability for and by Information Technology
 ISO/TC 184, Automation systems and integration
 ISO/TC 205, Building environment design
 IEC/TC 1, Terminology
 IEC/TC 3, Information structures and elements, identification and marking principles, documentation and graphical symbols
 IEC/TC 46, Cables, wires, waveguides, R.F. connectors, R.F. and microwave passive components and accessories
 IEC/SC 46A, Coaxial cables
 IEC/SC 46C, Wires and symmetric cables
 IEC/TC 48, Electrical connectors and mechanical structures for electrical and electronic equipment
 IEC/SC 48B, Electrical connectors
 IEC/SC 61C, Safety of refrigeration appliances for household and commercial use
 IEC/TC 64, Electrical installations and protection against electric shock
 IEC/SC 65B, Measurement and control devices
 IEC/SC 65C, Industrial networks
 IEC/TC 68, Magnetic alloys and steels
 IEC/TC 77, Electromagnetic compatibility
 IEC/TC 86, Fibre optics
 IEC/SC 86A, Fibres and cables
 IEC/SC 86B, Fibre optic interconnecting devices and passive components
 IEC/SC 86C, Fibre optic systems and active devices
 IEC/TC 100, Audio, video and multimedia systems and equipment
 IEC/TC 104, Environmental conditions, classification and methods of test

Some organizations external to ISO or IEC that collaborate with or are in liaison to ISO/IEC JTC 1/SC 25 include:
 CEN TC 247, BACnet
 CENELEC TC 205, Home and Building Electronic Systems (HBES)
 CENELEC TC 215, Electrotechnical aspects of telecommunication equipment
 Ecma International
 European Commission (EC)
 European Telecommunications Standards Institute (ETSI)
 IEEE 802.3, Ethernet Working Group
 ITU-T SG9, Broadband cable and TV
 ITU-T SG15, Networks, Technologies and Infrastructures for Transport, Access and Home
 ITU-T SG16, Multimedia
 Telecommunications Industry Association (TIA)
 United Nations Conference on Trade and Development (UNCTAD)
 United Nations Economic Commission for Europe (UNECE)

Member countries
Countries pay a fee to ISO to be members of subcommittees.

The 29 "P" (participating) members of ISO/IEC JTC 1/SC 25 are: Australia, Austria, Belgium, Canada, China, Czech Republic, Denmark, Finland, France, Germany, India, Ireland, Israel, Italy, Japan, Kazakhstan, Republic of Korea, Lebanon, Mexico, Netherlands, Norway, Poland, Russian Federation, Singapore, Spain, Sweden, Switzerland, United Kingdom, and United States.

The 18 "O" (observing) members of ISO/IEC JTC 1/SC 25 are: Argentina, Bosnia and Herzegovina, Croatia, Cuba, Ghana, Greece, Hong Kong, Hungary, Iceland, Indonesia, Kenya, Malaysia, New Zealand, Philippines, Romania, Serbia, Turkey, and Ukraine.

Published standards
ISO/IEC JTC 1/SC 25 currently has 177 published standards under their direct responsibility within the field of interconnection of information technology equipment, including:

See also
 ISO/IEC JTC 1
 List of ISO standards
 Deutsches Institut für Normung
 International Organization for Standardization
 International Electrotechnical Commission

References

External links 
 ISO/IEC JTC 1/SC 25 page at ISO

025
Network protocols